Gérard Kautai is a Tahitian professional football manager and a former football player who played as defender.

Career
In 1996 and since January 2004 until September 2007 he coached the Tahiti national football team. Since April 2014 he is a head coach of the AS Pirae.

He is the father of Iotua Kautai, who he also selected to represent Tahiti during the 2004 OFC Nations Cup.

References

External links

Profile at Soccerpunter.com

1952 births
Living people
French Polynesian football managers
Tahiti national football team managers
Place of birth missing (living people)
1973 Oceania Cup players
Association footballers not categorized by position
Association football players not categorized by nationality